Abdullah Faraj Al-Hathlool (born 20 October 1964), known as Abadi Al-Hathlool, is a Saudi Arabian former footballer who played as a midfielder for Al-Hilal. He competed in the men's tournament at the 1984 Summer Olympics.

References

1964 births
Living people
Saudi Arabian footballers
Saudi Professional League players
Al Hilal SFC players
Saudi Arabia international footballers
Olympic footballers of Saudi Arabia
Footballers at the 1984 Summer Olympics
Sportspeople from Riyadh
Association football midfielders
Asian Games silver medalists for Saudi Arabia
Asian Games medalists in football
Footballers at the 1986 Asian Games
Medalists at the 1986 Asian Games